Cymothoe indamora, the Indamora glider, is a butterfly in the Nymphalidae family. It is found in Nigeria, Cameroon, Equatorial Guinea, the Republic of the Congo, the Central African Republic, the Democratic Republic of the Congo and Uganda. The habitat consists of the transition zone between primary and secondary forests.

Adults are attracted to fallen fruit.

The larvae feed on Flacourtiaceae species.

Subspecies
Cymothoe indamora indamora (Nigeria: Cross River loop, Cameroon, Congo, Central African Republic, Democratic Republic of the Congo)
Cymothoe indamora amorinda van Someren, 1939 (Uganda: west to the Kalinzu Forest)
Cymothoe indamora canui Beaurain, 1985 (Bioko)

References

Butterflies described in 1866
Cymothoe (butterfly)
Butterflies of Africa
Taxa named by William Chapman Hewitson